"OMG" is a song by American producer Gryffin and Canadian singer Carly Rae Jepsen, released on July 31, 2019. A lyric video for the song was released the same day. The song reached number one on the US Billboard Dance Club Songs chart in the issue dated November 23, 2019, a first for both artists.

Promotion
Gryffin announced the collaboration and shared the cover art on July 25, captioning the post "Big one coming next week". The music video was released on October 10, 2019.

Track listing
Digital download
"OMG" - 3:35

OMG (Remixes Pt 1)
"OMG" (Moti Remix) - 2:55
"OMG" (Anki Remix) - 3:19
"OMG" (Seycara Orchestral Edition) - 3:03
"OMG" (Josh Le Tissier Remix) - 4:00
"OMG" (Alphalove Remix) - 3:17

Charts

Weekly charts

Year-end charts

References

2019 singles
2019 songs
Gryffin songs
Carly Rae Jepsen songs
Songs written by Ali Tamposi
Songs written by Carly Rae Jepsen
Songs written by John Ryan (musician)
Songs written by Andrew Haas
Songs written by Ian Franzino